Paul A Hampton (born October 26, 1970) is an American musician, songwriter, and producer, best known for his work as the keyboardist and creator of the ska band The Skeletones.

Biography 

Paul A Hampton was born in Fontana, California and lived in Riverside California for the first twenty-five years of his life. Raised in a Seventh Day Adventist family Hampton's piano skills were influenced by his mother Juanita Hampton. Hampton attended La Sierra Academy from second grade to grade nine. Summer of 1986 he met Rob Bradfield and Carlos Duncan, and together they formed The Skeletones. After a short run with Duncan and Bradfield, the three separated and bygones seemed to be The Skeletones Moira. Hampton attended Arlington High School, where he met Ernie Vigaroux and Rick Bonnin and the three continued on as The Skeletones.

Hampton released his first album as a high school senior while attending Perris High School in 1988 titled Introducing The Skeletones. Hampton toured with the band and soon begin recording other artists.

In 1990, Hampton created Culture Beat Music Publishing, ASCAP, which publishes the entire Skeletones catalog. Since inception, Culture Beat Music Publishing has expanded the catalog to include The Voodoo Glow Skulls, Warsaw Poland Brothers, Knock Out, Conspiracy of Thought, Arson, and others. Hampton is responsible for licensing the catalog to Viacom television networks such as MTV, VH1, Fuel, Oxygen, in episodes such as Viva La Bam, Maui Fever, Punk’d, Vans Triple Crown series, Parental Control, College Life, Nitro Circus, Rob Dyrdek Fantasy Factory and many others.

In 2000 Hampton co-founded Dynamic Multimedia Inc., a production company that produced live concert and DJ events throughout various venues in California, Mexico, and Hollywood. Events ranging from bi-weekly club events with five-hundred attendances, to large outdoor festivals with up to ten-thousand attendances. Said events include Chemistry LA – Avalon Hollywood, The Henry Fonda Theatre, Papas n Beer – Rosarito B.C., King of The Hill Winter Music Festival – Mt. High Resort.

In 2001, Hampton entered the mortgage industry as a Mortgage Loan Officer. From 2001 to 2005, he originated home loans at Ditech.com and later took on a position at Lenox Home loans as mortgage sales manager. There, Hampton created Team Net and was instrumental in the development of the internet loan originations division overseeing thirty-three loan officers.

From 2005 to 2012 Hampton continued to work in the mortgage industry, as well as maintain music licensing, concert and event promotions with Dynamic Multimedia. Summer of 2006 Hampton, in collaboration with keyboardist Rick Bonnin, went on to Produce The Skeletones Do It Right ep, Bump full-length album, and singles Dr. Bones and Without Love.

In 2013 Hampton joined the line up of the legendary ska, punk, funk, rock band Fishbone on keyboards and vocals. In the five-year run with Fishbone Hampton toured the world, and performed alongside legendary artist such as Ernie Isley, George Clinton, performed in live collaborations with Bad Brains, Living Color, MOE, and participated in soul stirring performances on stages such as the Apollo Theater, Wolftrap, and Red Rocks.

Hampton's recording experience includes collaborations and productions with recording artists such as Gwen Stefani, Angelo Moore, Phillip "Fish" Fisher, Norwood Fisher, Rocky George, John Steward, Jay Armant Jr., Walter Kibby, John Feldman, Charles Wright, Save Ferris, Voodoo Glow Skulls, The Insyders, Ron Moss, Guy Oseary, and Jay Rifkin.

Today, Hampton is married to Sandra Brown-Hampton with son and daughter Coda Jazz Hampton, and Calyx Harmony Hampton. Paul currently enjoys a robust career in Mortgage and Entertainment.

References

1970 births
Living people
American male songwriters
American keyboardists